The Exchange, Twickenham is a community building, including a 320-seat theatre, at Brewery Wharf opposite Twickenham railway station in the London Borough of Richmond upon Thames. It opened in October 2017. The building is owned by Richmond upon Thames Council and is managed by St Mary's University, Twickenham.

Its programme includes talks, drama performances, film screenings by the local Twickenham Cinema Club, and folk music events organised in partnership with TwickFolk.

References

External links
Official website

2017 establishments in England
Arts organizations established in 2017
Cinemas in London
Folk music venues
Music venues in London
Performing arts venues in the United Kingdom
St Mary's University, Twickenham
Theatres in the London Borough of Richmond upon Thames
Twickenham